Shoshana Ribner (also "Rivner", ; February 20, 1938 – 29 June 2007) was an Israeli Olympic swimmer.

Biography
Shoshana Ribner was born in Vienna, Austria. Her family immigrated to Israel when she was an infant. Ribner began competing as a swimmer at the age of 13. 
 Her trainer, 24-year-old Nachum Buch, swam for Israel at the 1952 Summer Olympics.

Ribner's son, Damon Fialkov, was Israel's 200-meter backstroke champion in 1981.

Swimming career
Ribner joined the Brit Maccabi Atid swimming club of Tel Aviv at the age of 13. She won gold medals in the 100-meter and 400-meter crawls at the 1953 Maccabiah Games. 

She competed for Israel at the 1956 Summer Olympics, when she was 18 years old, in Melbourne, Australia, in Swimming--Women's 100 metre freestyle. She finished 7th in her heat, with a time of 1:10.3, and did not advance to the finals. She was the only female on Israel's 15-person Olympic team. Her best time in the 100 meter freestyle was 1:09.3, and her fastest time for the 400 meter freestyle was 5:42.59, as of 1956.  That year she was named Israel's Athlete of the Year.

Ribner won two gold medals and two silver medals (including a silver medal in the 400 m) at the 1957 Maccabiah Games. 

In 1998, she was named one of Israel's top 50 athletes in its history.

References

External links
 

1938 births
2007 deaths
Austrian Jews
Austrian emigrants to Israel
Austrian people of Israeli descent
Jewish swimmers
Olympic swimmers of Israel
Maccabiah Games gold medalists for Israel
Competitors at the 1953 Maccabiah Games
Israeli Jews
Israeli female swimmers
Swimmers at the 1956 Summer Olympics
Maccabiah Games medalists in swimming
Maccabiah Games silver medalists for Israel
Competitors at the 1957 Maccabiah Games
Burials at Nahalat Yitzhak Cemetery